Clarence Peter Clowe (30 January 1893 – 10 October 1980) was an Australian rules footballer who played with Carlton and Essendon in the Victorian Football League (VFL).

Notes

External links 

Clarrie Clowe's profile at Blueseum

1893 births
1980 deaths
Australian rules footballers from Melbourne
Carlton Football Club players
Essendon Football Club players
Brunswick Football Club players
Australian military personnel of World War I
People from Richmond, Victoria
Military personnel from Melbourne